Gusinaya Bay is a bay in the Sakha Republic (Yakutia), Russian Federation.

Geography
The bay opens to the east in the southern limits of the East Siberian Sea. It is located northwest of the mouths of the Indigirka and southeast of the mouth of the Bogdashkina.
Gusinaya Bay is enclosed in the northeast by the Lopatka Peninsula. Lake Mogotoyevo lies a little inland to the north.

See also
Yana-Indigirka Lowland

References

External links
Fishing & Tourism in Yakutia

Bays of the Sakha Republic
Bays of the East Siberian Sea
East Siberian Lowland

ceb:Guba Gusinaya
sah:Хаастаах, тамах